Stewartville may refer to any of the following communities:

 Stewartville, California, United States
 Stewartville, Guyana
 Stewartville, Minnesota, United States

See also
Stewartsville (disambiguation)